Sir Harold Edward Gurden (28 June 1903 – 27 April 1989) was a British Conservative Party politician.

Gurden was educated in Birmingham at Lyttelton School and Birmingham University. He married Lucy Isabella, née Izon, on 16 April 1929. He became a technician in the dairy and food industries, and was founder-president of the Birmingham and District Dairymen's Association (1947–1950) and chairman of the Society of Dairy Technology (Midland Division). He was sometime President of the RSPCA.

Professional life 
Gurden served as a councillor on Birmingham City Council from 1946 to 1956, representing the ward of Selly Oak.

He was Member of Parliament for Birmingham Selly Oak from May 1955 to September 1974, before he lost the seat to Labour's Thomas Litterick.

Gurden was a strong proponent of the right to buy and a key figure in the campaign to compel local authorities to sell their council homes. In January 1972, he tabled a Private Members Bill that proposed "to extend to the tenants of dwellings owned by local authorities and other housing bodies the right to acquire the ownership or leasehold of their home".

Gurden was one of the first MPs to join the Conservative Monday Club.

He was knighted in the 1983 Birthday Honours.

References 

Times Guide to the House of Commons October 1974

External links 
 

Conservative Party (UK) MPs for English constituencies
Knights Bachelor
Politicians awarded knighthoods
UK MPs 1955–1959
UK MPs 1959–1964
UK MPs 1964–1966
UK MPs 1966–1970
UK MPs 1970–1974
UK MPs 1974
Councillors in Birmingham, West Midlands
Alumni of the University of Birmingham
1903 births
1989 deaths